Alberene is an unincorporated community in Albemarle County, Virginia. It is noted for its soapstone.

References

Unincorporated communities in Virginia
Unincorporated communities in Albemarle County, Virginia